Acosmeryx tenggarensis is a moth of the  family Sphingidae. It is known from the Moluccas.

References

Acosmeryx
Moths described in 2007
Moths of Oceania